Club 15-15 was a women's professional volleyball team  based in Palma, Majorca, Spain.

History
The club was found in 1994 as Icaro Volleyball Club, from Palma, Majorca, Balearic Islands, being promoted to the National First Division in 2001 and Liga FEV in 2005.

After the 2006/2007 season, the team earned the Superliga spot in 2007, winning the Liga FEV promotion playoff.

The next season, the first in Superliga, the team moved from Alaró to Palma, changing the name to Ícaro Palma.

For the 2008/2009 season the team merged with the male team Club Voleibol Portol, for economical reasons, playing both under the Palma Volley name.

Since the 2009/2010 season, the team uses Oxidoc Palma as team name.

The club was disbanded in December 2011, due to huge financial constraints.

Names evolution
 1994-2006 Club Voleibol Ícaro
 2006-2007 Ícaro Alaró
 2007-2008 Ícaro Palma
 2008-2009 Palma Volley
 2009–2012 Oxidoc Palma'

Notable players
 Natalya Mammadova
 Antonina Zetova
 Milagros Cabral
 Maurizia Cacciatori
 Áurea Cruz
 Iva Pejkovic
 Susana Rodríguez
 Desiree Glod

Palmares
 2007 FEV Cup Champions
 2007 FEV League Champions

References

External links
 Official site

Spanish volleyball clubs
Sports teams in the Balearic Islands
Volleyball clubs established in 1994
Sports clubs disestablished in 2012
Sport in Palma de Mallorca